ISO 3166-2:EE is the entry for Estonia in ISO 3166-2, part of the ISO 3166 standard published by the International Organization for Standardization (ISO), which defines codes for the names of the principal subdivisions (e.g., provinces or states) of all countries coded in ISO 3166-1.

Currently for Estonia, ISO 3166-2 codes are defined for 15 counties, 64 rural municipalities, and 15 urban municipalities.

Each code consists of two parts, separated by a hyphen. The second part is two digits for counties or three digits for municipalities.

Current codes
Subdivision names are listed as in the ISO 3166-2 standard published by the ISO 3166 Maintenance Agency (ISO 3166/MA).

Subdivision names are sorted in Estonian alphabetical order: a-v, õ, ä, ö, ü.

Click on the button in the header to sort each column.

Counties

 Notes

Municipalities

Changes

The following changes to the entry are listed on ISO's online catalogue, the Online Browsing Platform:

See also
 Subdivisions of Estonia
 FIPS region codes of Estonia
 NUTS codes of Estonia

References

External links
 ISO Online Browsing Platform: EE
 Counties of Estonia, Statoids.com

2:EE
ISO 3166-2
Estonia geography-related lists